General elections were held in Antigua and Barbuda on 9 March 1989, the second after it had become an independent Commonwealth realm. The elections were won by the governing Antigua Labour Party (ALP), whose leader Vere Bird was reelected as Prime Minister. Voter turnout was 60.7%.

This was Bird's eighth and final election victory. He resigned as Prime Minister in 1994, just before the subsequent general elections. Bird was replaced by his son, Lester Bird, the long-time party chairman.

Results

References

Antigua
Elections in Antigua and Barbuda
General election
March 1989 events in North America